The London Area Control Centre (LACC) is an air traffic control centre based at Swanwick near Fareham in Hampshire, southern England. It is operated by National Air Traffic Services (NATS), starting operations on 27 January 2002, and handles aircraft over much of England and Wales. The Swanwick facility replaces that of the former site at West Drayton.

LACC shares the Swanwick site with the London Terminal Control Centre (LTCC), which moved there in 2007.

AC-based controllers provide air traffic services mainly within the London Flight Information Region (FIR).  This airspace is split into five Local Area Groups (LAGs) which relate to the position of the airspace sector groups within the FIR. All sectors have the R/T callsign "London Control".

Also within the AC Operations room sit the FIR Flight Information Service Officers (FISOs) who provide an information service to aircraft operating within the London FIR as a whole using the callsign "London Information". 'Swanwick Military' controllers are also based in the AC Operations room.

Area Control (AC) 

Each sector is assigned a sector number which is used when co-ordinating the passage of aircraft between each other. Colloquial names are also in use for each group of sectors and are sometimes used within the co-ordination process when sectors are bandboxed together to indicate that one sector team is operating a whole group of sectors.

LACC is unusual in that it uses Class A airspace at lower levels. Therefore, VFR operation is prohibited.

Central LAG 

These sectors comprise the airspace above the London TMA airspace controlled from the TC operations room.
 London Upper (LUS) - Sectors 1, 2 & 24
 London Middle (LMS) - Sectors 25 & 26

East LAG 

These sectors comprise the airspace above TC East sectors to the East and North East of London.
 North Sea - Sectors 10 & 11
 Clacton - Sectors 12-14

West LAG 

This LAG is responsible for the largest amount of airspace within AC, extending from the West of Bournemouth down across the Western approaches and up into the south of Wales.
 Berry Head - Sectors 6, 9 & 36
 Brecon - Sectors 5, 8, 23 & 35

North LAG 

These sectors adjoin the airspace controlled by the Prestwick Centre to the North, airspace overlying some of the airspace around Manchester formerly controlled by the Manchester Centre (now also at Prestwick ) and airspace over the North of Wales across to Ireland.
 Lakes - Sectors 3, 4 & 7
 Daventry - Sectors 27/32 (Single Airspace Shared By Two Controllers), 28 & 34

Channel LAG 

This LAG comprises the sectors along the South Coast of England, bordering France and Maastricht airspace.
 Dover - Sectors 15-17
 Worthing  - Sectors 18-22

Terminal Control (TC) 
Since November 2007, terminal control (TC) facilities have also been provided from the Swanwick facility, after moving from the London Terminal Control Centre at West Drayton. TC is largely responsible for dealing with aircraft inbound/outbound to airports in the London TMA, including Heathrow, Gatwick and Stansted. It is also responsible for handling lower level enroute traffic in airspace surrounding the main London TMA up to FL245 (24,500ft).

Terminal or TMA sectors 
TC-based controllers provide air traffic services within the London Terminal Control Area (TMA).  This airspace is split into two groups or banks, TC North and TC South, which not only relates to the position of the airspace sector relative to London Heathrow, but also the direction in the Terminal Control Room in which that sector's controllers face when at their radar consoles.  TC North is further split into North East (3 sectors) and North West (2 sectors).  TC South is further split into South East (3 sectors) and South West (3 sectors).

TC North

 TC North West
 Departures:
 Heathrow departures to the north-west (UMLAT/ULTIB).
 Essex clutch (Stansted, Luton, and Cambridge) departures to the west.
 TC Bovingdon (BNN):
 Heathrow arrivals from the north, north-west, and west, via the Bovingdon (BNN) STAR.
 TC North East
 Departures:
 Heathrow departures to the north-east (BPK).
 Essex clutch (Stansted, Luton, and Cambridge) departures to the east.
 Thames clutch (City and Biggin Hill) departures to the north.
 TC Lambourne (LAM):
 Heathrow arrivals from the north-east, via the Lambourne (LAM) STAR.
 Thames clutch (City and Biggin Hill) arrivals from the north via the JACKO STAR.
 Southend arrivals from the north.
 TC LOREL:
 Essex clutch (Stansted, Luton, and Cambridge) arrivals from the north, south, and west, via the LOREL STAR.

TC South

 TC South West
 Departures:
 Heathrow departures to the west or south-west
 Gatwick departures to the south and west.
 TC Ockham (OCK):
 Heathrow arrivals from the south and south-west, via the Ockham (OCK) STAR.
 TC WILLO:
 Gatwick arrivals from the north and west/south-west, via the WILLO STAR.
 TC South East
 TC Biggin (BIG):
 Heathrow arrivals from the south-east via the Biggin (BIG) STAR.
 Heathrow departures to the south-east.
 Gatwick departures to the north and east.
 TC TIMBA:
 Gatwick arrivals from the south/south-east and east via the TIMBA STAR.
 TC GODLU:
 Thames clutch (City and Biggin Hill) arrivals from the south via the GODLU STAR.
 Southend arrivals from the south.

At its busiest, each sector will have a radar controller. When it is quieter sectors are "bandboxed" with one controller operating multiple sectors, until at night there may only be one controller operating the whole bank.  Each bank will also have up to two further supernumerary controllers acting as co-ordinators (to liaise with other sectors and other units, and generally assist the radar controllers), and up to two assistants to prepare flight progress strips, operate computer systems and assist with flight data duties.

Aircraft departing Heathrow, Gatwick, Luton (to the north or west only), and Stansted mostly depart on a free-flow principle:  the radar controllers do not release each individual flight for departure, they just receive a pre-note via a computer system that the flight is pending.  This cuts down on inter-unit co-ordination and allows the tower controller at the airport to decide the most efficient departure order.  In many cases the aircraft's Standard Instrument Departure (SID) routing does not conflict with the  approach sequence of aircraft arriving at the airport, so the airport's approach control does not need to handle the aircraft and it is transferred straight to the TMA controller on departure.  The TMA controllers then climb the departures through the arrivals to the airports that they are also working.

Arrivals to the London airports are handed over from LACC at Swanwick or the TC en-route sectors, usually following STARs and are descended against the departing traffic, sorted out into different levels, and routed to various holds (generally at the end of STARs), where they will hold until the approach control units are ready to position them into an approach sequence to land.

Approach sectors 

The Approach Control units for the five major London airports are also controlled from TC, plus the radar approach services for Biggin Hill and initial sequencing for some Southend traffic.  Each approach unit has more than one sector.  The majority of the work for the approach units is controlling the sequence of aircraft making an approach at an airport from the holds until established on final approach about four miles away from the airport.  The approach units also handle some aircraft departing from the airport, when that aircraft's departure conflicts with the approach sequence.

Slightly unusual to the approach units at TC is that some of the INT (Intermediate Approach) sectors can be staffed by two controllers at a time, making transmissions on the same frequency in the following fashion:

 INT: Responsible for initial approach sequencing from the holding stacks.
 INT Support: Responsible for:
 Accepting inbound releases from overlying controllers (and any other coordination as necessary).
 Issuing inbound aircraft with a runway and delay time.
 Descending aircraft in the holding stacks.

This allows both controllers to maintain greater situational awareness, whilst limiting unnecessary frequency changes.

Stansted's approach control unit is known as TC Essex because its holding stacks are also used by Luton traffic. Essex INT separates Luton traffic from Stansted traffic but does not sequence it before handoff to TC Luton.

City's approach control unit is known as TC Thames because its holding stacks are also used by Biggin Hill traffic. Thames INT vectors Biggin Hill traffic out of controlled airspace, and onto an approach, before handoff to Biggin Approach (not located at TC). In addition, Thames has responsibility for some Southend and all low-level London CTR traffic (the latter due to its much lower workload, compared to the Heathrow sectors).

En-route sectors 
TC is slightly unusual for a Terminal Control Centre in that it also has a number of en-route sectors responsible for lower levels of airspace on the outside, on top of and in the outer parts the TMA. These sectors not only include Class A airspace in the TMA and surrounding CTAs below FL195, but also Class C airspace above FL195.  These are controlled from TC because they mainly feed traffic into and out of the main London airports.  They are grouped as TC East (4 sectors), TC Midlands (4 sectors) and TC Capital (2 sectors). TC Midlands is somewhat of a hybrid since it also interacts directly with airports and the aircraft departing from them in the same way as the TMA sectors.

TC East

Controls traffic below FL215 to the East of the London TMA. Airspace adjoins the international boundary with Amsterdam and Brussels lower-level airspace. Most traffic will speak to 2 TC East Sectors.

The primary flows are: TC DAGGA -> TC REDFA (Departures) and TC JACKO -> TC SABER (Arrivals) with any differences from this pattern noted below.

 TC DAGGA: London Departures to the East (to TC REDFA). Stansted & Luton Departures to the South (to TC SABER). City Arrivals from the West (to TC DAGGA).
 TC REDFA: London Departures to the East (from TC DAGGA). Stansted & Luton Arrivals from the East.
 TC SABER: London Arrivals from the East (from TC JACKO). Stansted & Luton Departures to the South (from TC DAGGA). Southend Departures to the East (to TC DAGGA).
 TC JACKO: London Arrivals from the East (to TC SABER). London Departures to the Southern Netherlands (from TC REDFA). City Arrivals (from TC DAGGA)

TC Midlands

Controls traffic below FL195-215 in the Southern Daventry Corridor (including overflights). Airspace adjoins the Northern Daventry Corridor, which is controlled from the Manchester Area Control Centre (located in Prestwick).

 TC COWLY: Southbound traffic - London Arrivals from the North and North-West. Birmingham & East Midlands Departures/Arrivals to/from the South.
 Composed of 2 sectors, COWLY W and COWLY E. Traffic flow is COWLY W -> COWLY E.
 TC WELIN: Northbound traffic - London Departures to the North and North-West. Birmingham & East Midlands Departures/Arrivals to/from the North.
 Composed of 2 sectors, WELIN W and WELIN E. Traffic flow is WELIN E -> WELIN W.

TC Capital

Controls traffic overflying the London TMA between FL155-FL215 (including overflights and departures/arrivals which must cross the TMA).

Positions:

 TC CPT (Compton): (Primarily) Southbound Traffic in the Western London TMA.
 TC VATON: (Primarily) Northbound traffic in the Eastern London TMA.

References

External links 
 En-Route Services information from NATS

2002 establishments in England
Air traffic control centers
Air traffic control in the United Kingdom
Buildings and structures in Hampshire
Aviation in England
Aviation in London
Transport in Hampshire